Luigi Di Bartolomeo (7 January 1943 – 18 February 2022) was an Italian politician. He was a member of Christian Democracy, before joining the centre-right party The People of Freedom in 2009 and then Forza Italia in 2013.

Biography
Di Bartolomeo was born in Campobasso, Molise, on 7 January 1943.

He served as President of Molise from August 1992 to December 1993 and as Mayor of Campobasso from June 2009 to May 2014. Di Bartolomeo was elected for the Senate of the Republic at the 2006 general election.

Di Bartolomeo died on 18 February 2022, at the age of 79.

See also
2006 Italian general election
2009 Italian local elections
List of mayors of Campobasso
List of presidents of Molise

References

External links
 
 

1943 births
2022 deaths
20th-century Italian politicians
21st-century Italian politicians
Christian Democracy (Italy) politicians
Forza Italia (2013) politicians
The People of Freedom politicians
Senators of Legislature XV of Italy
Mayors of Campobasso
Presidents of Molise